"The Promise" is a single by British girl group Girls Aloud, taken from their fifth and final studio album Out of Control (2008). The song was written by Brian Higgins and his production team Xenomania. Influenced by Phil Spector and music of the 1960s, "The Promise" is an upbeat love song. Upon its release in October 2008, the single became Girls Aloud's fourth number one on the UK Singles Chart, continuing their six-year streak of top ten hits.

The music video is set at a drive-in movie theatre, where Girls Aloud watch themselves performing as a 1960s girl group on screen. "The Promise" was promoted through numerous live appearances, including a high-profile performance on The X Factor, and served as the opening number of 2009's Out of Control Tour. The song was praised and appreciated by most contemporary music critics, who lauded the song despite considering it unusual for Girls Aloud. "The Promise" was awarded Best British Single at the 2009 Brit Awards, the group's first win at the ceremony.

Background and composition
"The Promise" is an homage to 1960s music, particularly Phil Spector's famous Wall of Sound technique. It has been described as "a 1960s-influenced pop gem given a contemporary Girls Aloud twist". Peter Robinson, however, noted that the song "also hinted at a mellower side of 1970s New York disco, as if it were some sort of long soundtrack from a deleted scene in Saturday Night Fever." The song is written in A major with a time signature in common time and a tempo of 88 beats per minute. The vocal range spans from G♯3 to C5. The chord progression varies throughout the song, but chords include E, Am, C, A, Dm, and D. "The Promise" is composed in rondo form, the chorus serving as the song's only repeated section. A key change takes place before the song's final chorus.

Both the radio edit and the album version of the song were edited from the full-length version for release. The radio edit lasts 3:42 and has a cold ending. The album version of "The Promise" is around fifteen seconds longer, opting for a repeat and fade of Sarah Harding's first verse following the final chorus.

The backing track for the song was composed by two Australian musicians, Jason Resch and Kieran Jones, who would later play the song for Brian Higgins. Higgins and Miranda Cooper, afraid they would "ruin the moment", waited weeks to write the song's lyrics; they eventually wrote the song in seven minutes. Higgins said, "We knew that was the piece of music Girls Aloud needed to announce them as a supergroup in this country, so we knew we couldn't drop the ball melodically or lyrically." He elaborated, "Girls Aloud's records were more driving and pumping and innovative then than they are now because that's not what's required [...] "The Promise" was the sound of a big group, a group about to be huge. They needed the theme tune to the biggest girl group on the planet". As soon as Girls Aloud heard the song, they decided it should be the first single from Out of Control. The group defied their record label's demands for another song to be released as the lead single, with the label claiming that the song would be "pop suicide", and Nadine Coyle, who had just flown out from Los Angeles to do the Out of Control album photo shoot, threatened to not participate in the photo shoot at all and to immediately fly back to Los Angeles until the label conceded to the group's demands. The day before the song was due to be delivered to Fascination Records, the entire backing track was ditched and replayed.

Release
Described by the band's website as a "stormer of a track", "The Promise" premièred on Switch on BBC Radio 1 on 14 September 2008. During promotion, Girls Aloud announced dates for 2009's Out of Control Tour.

The song was released as a physical CD single in Ireland on 15 October 2008, followed by a digital release in Ireland and the United Kingdom on 19 October. The physical CD was released in the UK a day afterwards. It was originally scheduled for release on 27 October 2008, but the release was brought forward a week. The CD single featured a brand new b-side entitled "She", while an exclusive remix of "The Promise" by Jason Nevins was available as an iTunes exclusive. "The Promise" was also remixed by Dave Audé. A limited edition picture disc was made available exclusively through Girls Aloud's official website, featuring a live performance of "Girl Overboard (song)" as the b-side. The song was digitally released in Germany on 16 January 2009 and physically on 27 March.

"The Promise" is the opening track on Now 71 and appears on the Brit Awards 2009 nominees album. The Flip & Fill remix appears on Clubland 14. The song was released Digitally in New Zealand and also was released in Australia, unusual for an Independent label from Fascination Records, the sub label from Polydor.

Reception

Critical response
"The Promise" received mostly positive reviews from music critics. Although it was said to be "not what you'd necessarily expect from the gorgeous girl group," the song was praised for "its fantastic melody". The song was described as "more interesting than the average retro-pop nugget." Digital Spy referred to the single as "a cute, wistful pop song" with "some nice Spectorish touches in the production and a lovely, classic-sounding melody" that "grows more persuasive with every listen." It was praised for its "heavenly harmonies and a chorus that glides in and scoops you up in its arms." Rebecca Nicholson of The Guardian felt the song was "disappointing" because "Girls Aloud's producers have always been capable of making exciting and innovative pop music". However, Caroline Sullivan of the same publication thought the song was an album highlight - "nothing hits the spot like the Phil Spector-like single The Promise, one of this year's better chart-toppers." John Murphy of musicOMH.com argued that although "it may lack the innovation and attitude of some of their previous work, but if you're looking for sparkling, fresh and sheer bloody fun pop music, then there's nobody better right now than Girls Aloud."

"The Promise" received criticism for "too many cooks spoiling the broth. The production is so overegged and the vocals so treacly [...] you'll get a sugar rush, but you won't feel good about yourself afterwards." It was also criticised for being "a shameless attempt at trying to cash in on the Duffy and Winehouse favoured 60's femme pop." On the other hand, Slant Magazine said that while it "suggests the girls have [...] shallowly jumped aboard the retro-soul bandwagon led by Duffy and Amy Winehouse, [...] the song's go-for-broke, very modern re-imagining of Spector's Wall of Sound proves to be more authentic and entertaining than most other recent attempts". It has also received comparisons to Girls Aloud's previous single, "Can't Speak French". It has also claimed, by Terry Wogan, that the tune features the melody from the theme song of his 1980s British TV quiz show Blankety Blank.

"The Promise" was honoured as Best British Single at the 2009 BRIT Awards, Girls Aloud's first win at the ceremony. The song was also nominated for PRS for Music's Most Performed Work at the 2010 Ivor Novello Awards. It was also awarded the Popjustice £20 Music Prize.

Chart performance
"The Promise" entered the UK Singles Chart at number one, knocking off Pink's "So What" from the top. Early midweek figures suggested that the song was outselling "So What" by nearly two to one. "The Promise" was Girls Aloud's first original number one single since their debut "Sound of the Underground" (although the charity singles "I'll Stand by You" and "Walk This Way" both peaked at number one). "The Promise" sold 77,110 copies in its first week, making it Girls Aloud's second best first week, beaten only by "Sound of the Underground" back in 2002. The single became the fastest selling single of 2008 until "Hero" - a charity single by the finalists on The X Factor - sold in excess of 100,000 copies two days after release, and 313,244 copies overall. Cheryl Cole, who was also on The X Factor, joked, "I don't mind being knocked off number one - for this cause only!" On 28 December 2008, the UK Singles Chart listed "The Promise" as the number 17 best-selling single in their year-end countdown. It was certified gold by the British Phonographic Industry in January 2009. PRS for Music named "The Promise" as the sixth-most played song of 2009 in the UK, using data taken from the count of plays and performances online, live, and on TV and radio.

Additionally, the song entered the Irish Singles Chart at number four, their first time in the top four since 2004's "I'll Stand by You". In its second week on the Irish Chart, "The Promise" had risen two places to number two only being kept off by The X Factor finalists who were at number one.

Following Sarah Harding's death in September 2021, the song had a resurgence in popularity with streams spiking at 340%.

Music video

Filming for "The Promise" music video was on 15 September 2008. The video premièred on AOL's website on 25 September 2008. The music video was filmed by Trudy Bellinger for Merge @ Crossroads Films, and produced by Golden Square. They had just over three days to produce an open-air drive-in movie theatre using Flame and studio footage of five cars. Girls Aloud also reportedly auditioned the male actors/musicians in the music video, one of whom was guitarist Rene Woollard.

In the music video, the group members are at a drive-in movie theatre which is playing a black-and-white film of their performance of the song. The video - in both the drive-in cinema and the film being shown - pays homage to the '50s and '60s and soul acts of the time such as the Supremes. The film features flickering and flashes to emulate films of the time, in parallel to the cinema and attending group members. Harding gets out of her car and walks in front of the screen to sing her "Here I am... walking primrose..." verse.

Live performances
Girls Aloud first performed "The Promise" on BBC Radio 1's Live Lounge on 25 September, as well as a cover of Timbaland and OneRepublic's "Apologize". Nadine Coyle was not present, for she was ill with shingles.

The first televised performance occurred on 18 October 2008, on The X Factor, on which Cheryl Cole served as a member of the  judging panel at the time. The group wore their hair in big bouffant style with sparkling gold dresses, similar to those in the music video. Positioned in front of a lit-up frame, they sang live and performed simple, synchronized choreography. As the song's key change occurred, pyrotechnics exploded from the ceiling and a shower of sparks fell behind Girls Aloud. At the song's end, a second explosion of pyrotechnics occurred at the front of the stage. The group also performed the song on Friday Night with Jonathan Ross, GMTV, T4, and This Morning throughout promotion. Girls Aloud performed the song at the annual Children in Need telethon, as well as year-end shows like Top of the Pops' Christmas and New Year's Eve specials and 4Music's Top Tunes of 2008.

For their variety show The Girls Aloud Party, which aired between The X Factors finale and its results show on 13 December, Girls Aloud wore tight silver fishtail dresses. At the 2009 BRIT Awards, Girls Aloud performed in sleeveless sequined leotards. Accompanied by male dancers in white suits, the group performed a routine involving pink feather fans, giving the illusion of nudity until they emerged from behind the fans. The performance was nominated for Most Memorable Performance the following year at the 2010 BRIT Awards.

"The Promise" served as the opening song for Girls Aloud's 2009 Out of Control Tour. Girls Aloud "first appeared rising up through the floor on podiums in a haze of silver sparkle" for the opening, in which they are "wearing long, spangly dresses which they whipped off to reveal short mini skirts." The dresses, described as "angelic, shimmering, full-length gowns", were designed by Welsh fashion designer Julien MacDonald, along with the rest of the costumes. A dance-beat reprise of the song ended the show.

Girls Aloud performed "The Promise" at the 2012 Royal Variety Performance in London in November 2012 to celebrate their tenth anniversary and promote their greatest hits album Ten. It was televised on 3 December 2012 to over 8 million viewers. It was also performed at Capital FM's Jingle Bell Ball as part of a headlining set.

Formats and track listings
These are the formats and track listings of major single releases of "The Promise".

UK CD (Fascination / 1788035)
 "The Promise" (radio edit) – 3:43
 "She" (Cooper, Higgins, Lisa Cowling, Tim Larcombe, Shawn Lee, Paul Woods) – 3:24
UK 7" picture disc (Fascination)
 "The Promise" (radio edit) – 3:43
 "Girl Overboard" (Live at The O2) – 4:31
iTunes exclusive digital download
 "The Promise" (radio edit) – 3:43
 "The Promise" (Jason Nevins Remix) – 6:51

The Singles Boxset (CD19)
 "The Promise" (radio edit) – 3:43
 "She" – 3:24
 "Girl Overboard" (Live at The O2) – 4:31
 "The Promise" (Jason Nevins Extended Mix) – 6:51
 "The Promise" (Jason Nevins Radio Edit) – 3:57
 "The Promise" (Jason Nevins Dub Mix) – 6:07
 "The Promise" (Dave Audé Radio Edit) – 3:50
 "The Promise" (Dave Audé Club Mix) – 7:08
 "The Promise" (Dave Audé Dub Mix) – 7:12
 "The Promise" (Flip & Fill Remix) – 6:10

Credits and personnel
Drums: Florrie Arnold
Engineering: Toby Scott, Dan Aslet
Guitars: Nick Coler, Jason Resch, Kieran Jones, Owen Parker
Mixing: Jeremy Wheatley
Programming and keyboards: Tim Powell, Brian Higgins, Matt Gray, Toby Scott, Nick Coler, Miranda Cooper, Jason Resch, Owen Parker
Songwriting: Miranda Cooper, Brian Higgins, Jason Resch, Kieran Jones, Carla Marie Williams
Strings and woodwind: Mark C. Brown, Mike Kearsey, Jo Auckland, Nick Squires, Stefan Defiletm, Susan Early, Adrian Smith

Charts

Weekly charts

Year-end charts

Decade-end chart

Certifications

Release history

References

2008 singles
Brit Award for British Single
Fascination Records singles
Girls Aloud songs
Music videos directed by Trudy Bellinger
Song recordings produced by Xenomania
Songs written by Brian Higgins (producer)
Songs written by Miranda Cooper
UK Singles Chart number-one singles
2008 songs
Songs written by Carla Marie Williams

bg:The Promise (песен на Гърлс Алауд)
pl:The Promise
pt:The Promise